Jeevitham Oru Gaanam is a 1979 Indian Malayalam film,  directed by Sreekumaran Thampi. The film stars Madhu, Srividya, M. G. Soman and Roja Ramani in the lead roles. The film has musical score by M. S. Viswanathan.

Cast

Madhu
Srividya
M. G. Soman
Shobhana (Roja Ramani)
Sukumari
Vaikkam Mani
Unnimary
Adoor Bhavani
Bhagyalakshmi
Kuthiravattam Pappu
Master Rajakumaran Thampi
Poojappura Ravi
Raji

Soundtrack
The music was composed by M. S. Viswanathan and the lyrics were written by Sreekumaran Thampi.

References

External links
 

1979 films
1970s Malayalam-language films
Films scored by M. S. Viswanathan
Films directed by Sreekumaran Thampi